Lars Martin Jonsson (born January 2, 1982) is a Swedish former professional ice hockey defenceman. He played most of his career in Sweden for Leksands IF, Timrå IK, HV71, and Brynäs IF. He spent two years in North America playing for the Philadelphia Flyers organization, appearing in eight National Hockey League (NHL) games.

Playing career
Jonsson began playing for Leksands IF of Elitserien in 1999. Shortly after the season ended, he was drafted in the first round of the 2000 NHL Entry Draft by the Boston Bruins. Although the Bruins continually showed interest in him, attempting to sign him several times, they ran into issues with the NHL Collective Bargaining Agreement, which now states that European prospects will no longer remain indefinite property of the teams that draft them. As a result, the Bruins chose not to sign him and decided to instead receive the 37th overall pick in the 2006 Draft as compensation. The Bruins selected Yuri Alexandrov, a Russian defenseman who would play 66 games with the Providence Bruins during the 2010-11 AHL season before returning to Russia in 2011.

On the first day of free agency, Jonsson signed a one-year contract with the Philadelphia Flyers. He alternated between the Flyers and their AHL affiliate, the Philadelphia Phantoms. Although an ankle sprain caused him to miss the beginning of the 2006–07 season, he started with the Flyers, mainly on the powerplay, but he was sent down to play for the Phantoms after two games to adjust to North American hockey. He was called back up to the Flyers on November 21, 2006. He was later reassigned to the Phantoms on September 27, 2007.

Having spent two seasons in North America, Jonsson returned to the Swedish Elitserien by signing a two-year contract with Brynäs IF on May 15, 2008.

On August 15, 2013, Jonsson officially announced his retirement from hockey.

Awards
 Named Best Defenseman in TV-pucken in 1998.
 Bronze medal at the IIHF World U18 Championship in 2000.
 Promotion to Elitserien with Leksands IF in 2002.

Career statistics

Regular season and playoffs

International

References

External links
 
Inside Hockey - Turning Promise into Performance - 10/08/06

1982 births
Living people
Almtuna IS players
Boston Bruins draft picks
Brynäs IF players
HV71 players
IF Björklöven players
IFK Arboga IK players
Leksands IF players
National Hockey League first-round draft picks
People from Borlänge Municipality
Philadelphia Flyers players
Philadelphia Phantoms players
Swedish ice hockey defencemen
Timrå IK players
Sportspeople from Dalarna County